Lee Otis Rogers (October 8, 1913 – November 23, 1995), nicknamed "Buck", was a professional pitcher in Major League Baseball who played for the Boston Red Sox and Brooklyn Dodgers during the 1938 season. 

Despite a successful collegiate baseball career at the University of Alabama, Rogers' MLB experience was limited to a single season. Following his brief baseball career, he served in the US Navy during World War II.

Born in Tuscaloosa, Alabama, Rodgers died in Little Rock, Arkansas, on November 23, 1995, aged 82.

References

External links

1913 births
1995 deaths
Major League Baseball pitchers
Baseball players from Alabama
Brooklyn Dodgers players
Boston Red Sox players
Charlotte Hornets (baseball) players
Little Rock Travelers players
Montreal Royals players
Minneapolis Millers (baseball) players
Nashville Vols players